Gheorghe Chivu (born 7 October 1947) is a Romanian linguist and philologist, university professor and member of the Romanian Academy since 2023.

He was born in Micșuneștii Mari, Ilfov County, and attended high school in nearby Snagov.

References

1947 births
Living people
People from Ilfov County
Titular members of the Romanian Academy
University of Bucharest alumni
Academic staff of the University of Bucharest